Daniel, Dan, or Danny Russell may refer to:

Daniel Lindsay Russell (1845–1908), governor of North Carolina
Dan Russell (cartoonist) (1906–1999), Australian cartoonist
Dan Monroe Russell Jr. (1913–2011), United States federal judge
Daniel J. Russell (born 1932), American judge in New Jersey
Daniel R. Russel (born 1953), U.S. diplomat and Assistant Secretary of State
Dan Russell (actor), American voice actor in Legend of the Dragon and The Amazing World of Gumball
Danny Russell (rugby league, born 1969), (born 1969), rugby league footballer of the 1990s and 2000s
Danny Russell (rugby league, born 1983) (born 1983), rugby league footballer of the 2000s for Penrith Panthers
Daniel Russell (rugby league) (born 1995), Australian rugby league footballer of the 2010s
Dan Russell (artist manager), American artist manager, musician and record producer
Daniel M. Russell, American computer scientist
Dan Russell, Canadian radio presenter on the station AM 650